Amblyptilia aeolodes is a moth of the family Pterophoridae.  This species was first described by Edward Meyrick in 1902. It is endemic to New Zealand and is found on the Chatham Islands, Big South Cape Island, and the subantarctic Auckland and Campbell Islands.The larvae feed on dicotyledonous herbs.

Taxonomy 
This species was first described by Edward Meyrick in 1902 and named it Platyptilia aeolodes. In 1928 George Hudson discussed and illustrated the species. However Hudson, when referring to P. aeolodes as being in the North and South Islands, is referring to Platyptilia repletalis (now known as Amblyptilia repletalis). In 1971 and again in 1988 John S. Dugdale discussed this species under the name Platyptilia aelodes, a misspelling of the original name. In 1993 Cees Gielis placed this species within the genus Amblyptilia. This placement was followed in 2010 in the New Zealand Inventory of Biodiversity. The lectotype specimen, collected by J. Fourgère at Chatham Island, is held at the Natural History Museum, London.

Description 

Meyrick described this species as follows:
This species varies in intensity of colouration but can be distinguished from A. falcatalis as A. aeolodes is smaller and darker and the second segment of the forewing has a more prominent angle on the edge most distant from the body. Also the principal hindwing scale tuft on the dorsal side of the forewings is only slightly beyond the middle where as with A. falcatalis the scale tuft is broader and considerably beyond the middle. A. aeolodes is very similar in appearance to A. repletalis, a species found on the North and South Islands. However there are differences in the genitalia of these two species. Also A. repletalis is a smaller moth with a more indistinct dark triangle shaped pattern on its forewings.

Dugdale described the larva of this species as follows:

Distribution 
A. aeolodes is endemic to New Zealand. It is found in southern most islands of New Zealand, specifically on the Chatham Islands, Big South Cape Island, and the subantarctic Auckland and Campbell Islands.

Hosts 
The larvae feed on dicotyledonous herbs.

References

Moths described in 1902
Amblyptilia
Moths of New Zealand
Taxa named by Edward Meyrick
Endemic moths of New Zealand